Edward Mongtomery may refer to:
Ed Montgomery (musician) (born 1952), American gospel musician
Edward S. Montgomery (1910–1992), 1951 Pulitzer Prize-winning journalist
Edward B. Montgomery (born 1955), former U.S. Deputy Secretary of Labor and economist
Edward Montgomery (Australian politician) (1906–1986), Victorian state MP
Edward William Montgomery (1865–1948), Canadian cabinet minister
Eddie Montgomery, musician with Montgomery Gentry